Perotrochus quoyanus is a species of large sea snail, a marine gastropod mollusk in the family Pleurotomariidae, the slit snails.

Subspecies
 Perotrochus quoyanus insularis Okutani & Goto, 1985 (synonym: Perotrochus insularis Okutani & Goto, 1985 )
 Perotrochus quoyanus quoyanus (P. Fischer & Bernardi, 1856) (synonyms: Pleurotomaria quoyana Fischer & Bernardi, 1856; Perotrochus gemma F. M. Bayer, 1966; Perotrochus coltrorum Rios, 2003)

Description
The shell of Perotrochus quoyanus quoyanus has a trochiform shape. It is obtusely carinated, with the base rounded, flattened and concave but not umbilicated. The spire is turbinate, terminating in an acuminate apex. The nine, granulose whorls are slowly increasing. They are rounded and swollen toward the suture. They are divided into two unequal portions by the slit fasciole. The slit fascicle below the
middle is decussated by semicircular and spiral striae. The slit is quite wide, but short. The umbilical depression is excavated, nacreous, iridescent, and surrounded
by slight concentric grooves. The semioval aperture is nacreous within. The columellar margin is recurved with a nacreous callosity. The nearly sharp outer lip is not reflexed. The color of the shell is pale rose, with obscure dashes or flammules of reddish brown.

Distribution
This species occurs in the Caribbean Sea and the Lesser Antilles. Fresh-dead (crabbed) shells have been trapped offshore West coast BARBADOS, at depths around 180-200 metres. Living specimens were recovered during the late 1980s, via Johnson Sea-Link II submersible, operating from R.V. Seward Johnson of Harbor Branch Oceanographic Institute at greater depths, 2-3 miles offshore West coast Barbados.

References

External links

 Encyclopedia of Life
 To ITIS
 To World Register of Marine Species

Pleurotomariidae
Gastropods described in 1856